Viveka is a Sanskrit and Pali term translated into English as discernment or discrimination. Viveka is considered as first requirement for the spiritual journey. The next requirement in the joureny in Vedanta, vairagya as known as detachment is a natural extension of viveka. Advaita Vedanta Darshana interprets viveka as discrimination between the real and the unreal while Visistadvaita Vedanta Darshana interprets viveka as discrimination of food.

Advaita Interpretation
According to Rao and Paranjpe, viveka can be explained more fully as a sense of discrimination; wisdom; discrimination between the real and the unreal, between the self and the non-self, between the permanent and the impermanent; discriminative inquiry; right intuitive discrimination; ever-present discrimination between the transient and the permanent. Viveka also means the power of separating the invisible Brahman from the visible world, a faculty of distinguishing and classifying things according to their real properties and the ability to discern the self or atman from empirical world. It is an antidote to avidya which is the root cause of all suffering. Viveka can be cultivated by association with Jnanis and saints, the study of Vedanta literature, meditation, and by separating oneself from the senses. 

The Vivekachudamani is a Sanskrit poem in dialogue form that addresses the development of viveka. Within the Vedanta tradition, there is also a concept of vichara which is one type of viveka. Viveka is the basis of the monastic name of Swami Vivekananda, the first Hindu spiritual teacher to journey to the west.

Visistadvaita Interpretation
According to Ramanujacharya of Sri Vaishnava Visistadvaita Vedanta Darshana, viveka means discrimination of food. Food contains all the energies that make up the forces of our body and mind and the material particles of the food eaten construct the instrument of thought. There are certain kinds of food that produce a certain change in the mind and the body. The following three things in food that must be avoided by Bhaktas:
 Jati: meaning the nature or species of the food. All exciting food should be avoided. For instance, meat should be avoided as it is impure by its nature as it can be obtained only by taking the life of another creature and it demoralizes other human beings by creating a class of cruel humans in the society that need to engage in the occupation of killing other creatures. Also, all exciting foods, such as onions, and garlic, all evil-smelling food such as sauerkraut, any food that has been standing for days till its condition is changed, and any food whose natural juices have been almost dried ups any food that is malodorous, should be avoided.
 Ashraya: meaning the person from whom it comes. The idea is that each person has a certain aura around them and whatever thing they touch, a part of their character and influence is left on it. Hence, care must be taken as to who touches the food and ensure that a wicked or immoral person must not touch it.
 Nimitta: meaning instruments and physical impurities. Dirt, dust, saliva, and other secretions must not be in food. All items used in food should be washed before cooking. The lips ought never to be touched with the fingers. Food partially eaten by someone else should not be eaten. 

When these things are avoided, food becomes pure. Further, Ramanuja quotes Chandogya Upanishad saying "If one eats pure food, one’s mind becomes pure. If the mind is pure, one’s memory becomes strong and steady. If the memory is good, one becomes free from all bondages and mind is a constant memory of God".

References

Hindu philosophical concepts
Buddhist philosophical concepts
Jain philosophical concepts